Youreka is an Indian film director, lyricist and screenwriter who has worked on Tamil films.

Career
Initially starting his career as a lyricist, Youreka made his debut as a filmmaker with Madurai Sambavam, a rustic action film starring Harikumar, Anuya Bhagvath and Karthika, where NDTV made their first production venture in the Tamil film industry. The film earned mixed reviews, with a critic from The Hindu noting "if only Youreka had paid attention to the screenplay and worked more on the climax" but "instead he seems to have been content with loading the hero with action scenes". Youreka next moved on to work on Sivappu Enakku Pidikkum (2017), a tale about a writer who is determined to put an end to child sexual abuse. Featuring himself in the lead role and as a producer, Youreka signed on actress Sandra Amy and completed the film by mid-2014. However, the film went through production troubles and was only released several years later in January 2017. His latest release was Thoppi (2015) starring newcomers Murali Ram and Raksha Raj. The film was also marred with a spat towards release, with the director complaining that the producer cut scenes considerably in the second half without his knowledge. In their review, the Times of India noted "perhaps, the director's cut was more engaging" but "for now, we have to settle for a film that is modestly engaging but doesn't fulfil its initial promise".

In April 2017, he began working on a project titled Kattu Paya Sir Intha Kaali featuring Jaivanth and Ira Agarwal.

Filmography

Director
All films are in Tamil, unless otherwise noted.

Lyricist
Kadhal Seiya Virumbu - all songs
Madurai Sambavam - all songs
Oru Kadhal Seiveer - Rottu Mele

References

Living people
Film directors from Tamil Nadu
Tamil film directors
Tamil film poets
Year of birth missing (living people)